Lone Jack High School is a high school in Lone Jack, Missouri. It is operated by Lone Jack School District. The principal is Kathy Butler.

References

External links

High schools in Jackson County, Missouri
Public high schools in Missouri